David Treahearn is an English record producer, programmer, recording and mix engineer based in Richmond Upon Thames, England.

Treahearn is credited on more than 91 international commercial music releases as mix engineer, composer, musician and assistant with some of the world's most successful artists including Madonna, The Black Eyed Peas, Oasis, Björk, Britney Spears, Gwen Stefani, Depeche Mode, Elbow Massive Attack, Kylie Minogue, Britney Spears, Darren Hayes, Linkin Park, No Doubt, Dave Matthews, Keane, New Order, Janet Jackson, Natasha Bedingfield, Marilyn Manson, Girls Aloud, The Spice Girls and Turin Brakes.

Treahearn began his music career at Olympic Studios in London in January 2000, where he worked until 2007 as an assistant engineer to international Producer/Mixer Mark 'Spike' Stent. He also worked out of major London and Los Angeles recording studios including Abbey Road, Metropolis, The Town House, Westlake, Ocean Way and Henson with Stent and other renowned producers including Mirwais, Stuart Price, Richard 'Biff' Stannard, Dallas Austin and Ash Howes.

In 2007, Treahearn worked with French record producer Mirwais, whom he had previously worked with on Madonna's American Life album, to mix the Fischerpooner track "We Need A War" from the album Odyssey. He continued to provide programming, engineering and mixing services on various projects with The Spice Girls, Nelly Furtado, Sugababes, Alex Parks, Lee Ryan and Girls Aloud. In late 2007, Treahearn co-wrote, produced and mixed two albums in the 'Popstyles' series for specialist UK publisher Boosey & Hawkes. The track "Ice Cream" from Popstyles 1, was picked up as the main theme music for Hong Kong's high rating TV series, Moonlight Resonance, and featured on the Asian Sony/BMG 2008 double CD compilation, Strawberry Love, alongside Whitney Houston, Avril Lavigne, Britney Spears and Christina Aguilera.

In 2008, Treahearn worked with US record producer and songwriter Robert Conley, whom he had worked with at Olympic Studios to mix Australian artist Axle Whitehead's debut album Losing Sleep. The lead track taken from the album, "I Don't Do Surprises", was a top 10 ARIA chart hit and was shortlisted in 2009 by APRA Industry awards for 'Most Played Australian Work'. Also in that year he is credited with Gary Barlow on the Soundtrack to the UK Musical TV Series Brittania High. Treahearn worked again French producer Mirwais Ahmadzaï, co-writing and co-producing the track "Da" for French-Arabic project Y.A.S. on the debut album, Arabology.

In 2010, Treahearn worked with Biffco in the UK on the ITV network The X Factor series 7, produced by FremantleMedia's Thames and Simon Cowell's production company SYCOtv. He is credited with providing engineering on the UK Number One track "Heroes" by The X Factor Finalists.

In between 2011 and 2012, and after relocating to Australia with music partner Rob Haggett, The Slips were signed to EMI Records Australia, producing collaborations for local artists.

During 2012, their remix for Bjork's track "Moon from her album Biophilia was chosen as Track 12 on her 2012 remix album Bastards.

Treahearn has also been credited as a music engineer and mixer on commercial advertising campaigns and music videos and documentaries, for artists such as Oasis, Janet Jackson, Britney Spears and Depeche Mode.

References 

Year of birth missing (living people)
Living people
Musicians from London
English record producers
English songwriters